Sneath may refer to:

People
 Bob Sneath (born 1949), Australian politician
 H. Rochester Sneath (c. 1900–?), British hoax letter writer
 Peter Sneath (1923–2011), British microbiologist
 Samuel B. Sneath (1828–1915), American banker, railroad owner, and manufacturer
 William Sneath (born 1977), English cricketer

Other
 Sneath Glass Company, US-American manufacturer of glass